The 2021 Oxford City Council election took place on 6 May 2021, due to the postponement of local elections due to be held in 2020, and was to elect all 48 members of Oxford City Council. This was on the same day as the other local elections in England. Each of Oxford's 24 wards elect two councillors. 

The Labour Party was again defending its majority on the council, which it had controlled since 2008.

Background
Oxford City Council was subject to a boundary review following the 2018 election and thus all the seats were up for election. This was the first election held with new boundaries since 2002.

Results

Results by ward
Candidates are taken from the attached source.

Results are taken from the Oxford City Council website.

Barton and Sandhills

Blackbird Leys

Carfax and Jericho

Churchill

Cowley

Cutteslowe and Sunnymead

Donnington

Headington

Headington Hill and Northway

Hinksey Park

Holywell

Littlemore

Lye Valley

Marston

Northfield Brook

Osney and St. Thomas

Quarry and Risinghurst

Rose Hill and Iffley

St. Clement's

St. Mary's

Summertown

Temple Cowley

Walton Manor

Wolvercote

Notes

References

Oxford
2021
2020s in Oxford